This is a list of episodes for the series Signing Time!, which has aired on various PBS stations for approximately three years and has produced two series.

Series overview

{| class="wikitable"
! style="padding:0 8px;" rowspan="2"| Season
! style="padding:0 8px;" rowspan="2"| Episodes
! style="padding:0 80px;" colspan="2"| Originally aired (U.S. dates)
|-
! Season premiere
! Season finale
|-
| style="text-align:center;"|1
| style="text-align:center;"| 13
| style="text-align:center;"| May 1, 2002
| style="text-align:center;"| March 26, 2006
|-
| style="text-align:center;"|2
| style="text-align:center;"| 13
| style="text-align:center;"| August 31, 2007
| style="text-align:center;"| July 1, 2008
|}

Episode list

Series 1 (2002–2006)

Series 2 (2007–2008)

References

External links
Credits 
Series 1 Production numbers and descriptions - American Public Television
Series 2 Production numbers and descriptions - American Public Television
IMDb - Signing Time!

Signing time